Thomas Baer may refer to:

 Thomas M. Baer, American physicist
 Thomas S. Baer (1843–1906), American jurist